Elliot Haydn George Colburn (born 6 August 1992) is a British Conservative Party politician. He has been the Member of Parliament (MP) for Carshalton and Wallington since the 2019 general election. Colburn also served as councillor for the Cheam ward on Sutton Council from 2018 to 2022.

Early life
Colburn was born at St Helier Hospital and Queen Mary's Hospital for Children in St Helier, London. He grew up in Sutton, London. He attended Carshalton Boys Sports College. He has campaigned for the Conservative Party since the age of 13. Colburn studied politics at Aberystwyth University. He worked as a parliamentary assistant for the Sutton and Cheam MP Paul Scully, and Scotland Secretary Alister Jack. Colburn has also worked as a public affairs officer for South West London Health and Care Partnership.

Colburn was a Conservative candidate in the 2014 Sutton Council election for Wallington North ward, and came fourth. In the 2016 referendum on membership of the European Union, Colburn supported Brexit. He was elected to Sutton Borough Council as one of the three Conservative councillors for Cheam ward at the 2018 election, and sat on the council's People Committee and Scrutiny Committee. He stood down his council seat in 2022.

Parliamentary career
Colburn was selected as the Conservative candidate for Carshalton and Wallington on 11 February 2019. He was elected as an MP in the 2019 general election with a majority of 629 votes, defeating the incumbent Liberal Democrat MP Tom Brake, who had represented the seat since 1997. His campaign included local promises to extend the London Overground to Sutton, and to oppose the settling of gypsies and travellers in the local area.

He has been a member of the Petitions Committee and the Women and Equalities Committee since 2020. He is vice-chair of the All Party Parliamentary Group on HIV/AIDS. Colburn submitted a letter of no confidence in Prime Minister Boris Johnson following the publication of Sue Gray's report on Partygate in May 2022.

Colburn endorsed Penny Mordaunt in the July 2022 Conservative Party leadership election, and again in the October 2022 Conservative Party leadership election.

Personal life
Colburn is gay.

After receiving a homophobic death threat in 2021, he spoke out to raise awareness of the abuse MPs face.

Colburn has served as a trustee of the charitable organisation Community Action Sutton and as a Scout Leader for the 6th Carshalton Scout Group.

References

External links

1992 births
Living people
UK MPs 2019–present
Conservative Party (UK) MPs for English constituencies
English LGBT politicians
LGBT members of the Parliament of the United Kingdom
Gay politicians
Conservative Party (UK) councillors
People from Carshalton
People from Sutton, London
People from Cheam
British Eurosceptics
British health activists